The World Championship of Drivers has been held since . Driver records listed here include all rounds which formed part of the World Championship since 1950: this includes the Indianapolis 500 in 1950–1960 (though it was not run to Formula 1 rules), and the 1952 and 1953 World Championship Grands Prix (which were run to Formula 2 rules). Formula 1 races that were not qualification rounds for the World Championship are not included.

This page is accurate as of the 2023 Saudi Arabian Grand Prix. Drivers who are competing in the 2023 Formula One World Championship are highlighted in bold.

Races entered and started
Drivers are considered to be entered into a race if they attempt to compete in at least one official practice session with the intent of entering the race. These drivers are noted on the entry list for that race. A driver is considered to have started a race if they line up on the grid or at the pit lane exit for the start of the race. If a race is stopped and restarted, participation in any portion of the race is counted, but only if that portion was in any way counted towards the final classification (e.g., races stopped before the end of the leader's second lap are declared null and void).

Total entries

Total starts

Youngest drivers to start a race

Oldest drivers to enter a race

Oldest drivers to start a race

Most consecutive race starts

Most consecutive races that the driver entered and started.

Most consecutive race entries

Most races with a single constructor

Most races with a single engine manufacturer

Wins

Total wins

Percentage wins

Most wins in a season

Highest percentage of wins in a season

Most consecutive wins

Most wins in first championship season

Note:  Bruce McLaren won the 1959 United States Grand Prix in the first season in which he drove a Formula One car, but he entered in two championship races in the  season driving a Formula Two car on both occasions.

Youngest winners
(only the first win for each driver is listed)

Oldest winners
(only the last win for each driver is listed)

Fewest races before first win

Most races before first win

Most races without a win

Wins from farthest back on the starting grid

Most wins at the same Grand Prix

Most consecutive wins at the same Grand Prix

Most Grand Prix wins by drivers who have not won a World Championship

Most consecutive seasons with at least one Grand Prix win

Most sprint wins

Pole positions

Total pole positions

Percentage pole positions

Most consecutive pole positions

Most pole positions at the same Grand Prix

Most consecutive pole positions at the same Grand Prix

Most pole positions in a season

Highest percentage of pole positions in a season

Youngest polesitters
(only the first pole position for each driver is listed)

Oldest polesitters

Note: Michael Schumacher was aged 43 years, 144 days when he set the fastest time in qualifying for the 2012 Monaco Grand Prix, but he did not start the race from pole position due to a 5-place grid penalty incurred from the previous race.

Most races without a pole position

Fastest laps

Total fastest laps

Percentage fastest laps

Most fastest laps in a season

Highest percentage of fastest laps in a season

Youngest drivers to set fastest lap
(only the first fastest lap for each driver is listed)

Oldest drivers to set fastest lap
(only the last fastest lap for each driver is listed)

Podium finishes

Total podium finishes

Percentage podium finishes

Most podium finishes in a season

Most consecutive podium finishes

Most consecutive podium finishes from first race of season

Youngest drivers to score a podium finish
(only the first podium finish for each driver is listed)

Oldest drivers to score a podium finish
(only the last podium finish for each driver is listed)

Most races without a podium

Most career podiums without a win

Most career podiums without a World Championship

Most races before scoring a podium finish

Points
Throughout the history of the World Championship, the points-scoring positions and the number of points awarded to each position have varied, along with the number of events per season in which points could be scored – see the List of Formula One World Championship points scoring systems for details.

Total career points

Total points-scoring races
Note: this is not adjusted to the current points-scoring system.

Most consecutive points finishes

Most consecutive points scored 

 Sequence ongoing

Highest average points per race started

Highest percentage of points-scoring races (at least 15 entries)

Most championship points in a season

 Double points awarded in last race

Youngest drivers to score points
(only the first points finish for each driver is listed)

Oldest drivers to score points
(only the last points finish for each driver is listed)

Most points without a win

Most career points without being World Champion

World Champions with fewest career points

Most races before scoring points

Most races without scoring points

Races finished

Total career race finishes

Most consecutive race finishes

Race leaders

Led every lap, total races

Led every lap, percentage of races

For at least one lap, total races

For at least one lap, percentage of races

For at least one lap, youngest leaders
(only the first race led for each driver is listed)

Most laps led, total laps

Longest distance led, total

Most laps led without a win

Most consecutive laps in the lead

Multiple driver records

Wins from pole position

Most wins from pole position in a season

Pole, win, and fastest lap in same race
This is sometimes referred to as a "hat-trick".

Pole, win, fastest lap, and led every lap
This is sometimes referred to as a "grand slam" or "grand chelem".

Note: Only Ascari (Germany–Netherlands 1952), Clark (Netherlands–France 1963) and Vettel (Singapore–Korea 2013) have achieved the feat in consecutive races.
Only Ascari (France, Germany, Netherlands 1952), Clark (Netherlands, France, Mexico 1963; and South Africa, France, Germany 1965), Mansell (South Africa, Spain, Britain 1992) and Hamilton (China, Canada, Britain 2017) have achieved this feat three times in a single season.

Youngest

Oldest

Drivers' Championships

Total championships

Most consecutive championships

Fewest World Championship seasons before first title
(excluding drivers who competed from the very first championship season of 1950; including winning season)

Most World Championship seasons before first title

Largest gap between titles

Youngest World Drivers' Championship first-time winners
(at the moment they clinched their first/only title)

Youngest double World Drivers' Championship winners
(at the moment they clinched their second title)

Youngest triple World Drivers' Championship winners
(at the moment they clinched their third title)

Youngest World Drivers' Championship winners
(at the moment they clinched the title)

Other driver records

Not all De Cesaris's retirements were classified as 'DNF': he was classified as 3rd at the 1987 Belgian Grand Prix after running out of fuel and pushing his car over the line. For this reason, some sources list his 13 retirements and 1 DNQ in 1986 as the record for consecutive non-finishes in a season and 18 non-finishes starting the previous season.

See also
 List of Formula One drivers
 List of Formula One World Drivers' Champions

Footnotes

References

External links
 ChicaneF1 – Records
 StatsF1.com

Driver records
Formula One